Ramon Flanigan is a former American football player and coach. He is the director of former player relations at Southern Methodist University (SMU). Flanigan served as the head football coach at Lincoln University in Chester County, Pennsylvania from 2013 to 2014, compiling a record of 2–18.
As a college football player, he was a quarterback at SMU.

Head coaching record

References

External links
 SMU profile
 Lamar profile

Year of birth missing (living people)
Living people
American football quarterbacks
Lamar Cardinals football coaches
Lincoln Lions football coaches
North Texas Mean Green football coaches
Mississippi Valley State Delta Devils football coaches
SMU Mustangs football players